Not Just You is the second single by Australian recording artist Cody Simpson from his second EP Coast to Coast. It was released on September 16, 2011 by Atlantic Records.

Background
"Not Just You" was originally written and sung by Nasri Atweh back in 2009. Simpson made a cover of the song and its lyric video was uploaded to YouTube on September 16. On September 21, 2011, "Not Just You" was the #1 free single on iTunes. On October 11, a music video for the song was released on Simpson's YouTube channel.

Music video
The video for "Not Just You" was filmed on September 17, 2011, with Roman White. The video was filmed on Venice Beach, and in downtown L.A. The video was directed by Roman White. Madison McMillin co-stars in the video. The video premiered on October 11 on MTV and MTV.com.

References

Cody Simpson songs
2011 singles
Music videos directed by Roman White
Songs written by Adam Messinger
Songs written by Nasri (musician)